Morris Westfall (born April 5, 1939) is a former American Republican politician who has served in the Missouri General Assembly in the Missouri Senate and the Missouri House of Representatives.

Westfall graduated from University of Missouri with a bachelor's degree in agriculture.  He has served in the U.S. Marine Corps and has worked as a livestock farmer.  As chairman of the Senate Transportation Committee, Westfall has been an advocate for road safety and against drunk driving.

References

1939 births
20th-century American politicians
Republican Party members of the Missouri House of Representatives
Republican Party Missouri state senators
Living people